This Must Be the Plas is a 1959 album by saxophonist Plas Johnson.

Reception

The initial Billboard magazine review from November 30, 1959 chose the album as one of its "Special Merit Spotlights" and commented that "Eye-catching photo of curvaceous red-head gives package solid display value. Johnson's tasteful, warm sax solo work is heard to advantage on a group of oldies...Spinnable wax for jazz jocks and hip pop deejays".

Track listing
 "Too Close for Comfort" (Jerry Bock, George David Weiss, Larry Holofcener)
 "I Hadn't Anyone Till You" (Ray Noble)
 "Heart and Soul" (Hoagy Carmichael, Frank Loesser)
 "Poor Butterfly" (Raymond Hubbell, John Golden)
 "Memories of You" (Andy Razaf, Eubie Blake)
 "Just One of Those Things" (Cole Porter)
 "There Is No Greater Love" (Isham Jones, Marty Symes)
 "If I Had You" (Irving King, Ted Shapiro)
 "My Silent Love" (Edward Heyman, Dana Suesse)
 "Day In-Day Out" (Rube Bloom, Johnny Mercer)
 "My Old Flame" (Sam Coslow, Arthur Johnson)
 "S'il vous plait" (John Lewis)

Personnel
Plas Johnson – tenor saxophone
Larry Bunker, Gene Estes, Victor Feldman – vibraphone
Paul Smith – piano
Ernie Freeman – Hammond B-3 organ
Howard Roberts, Bill Pittman – guitar
Red Callender – double bass
Earl Palmer – drums

References

External links

1959 albums
Albums recorded at Capitol Studios
Capitol Records albums
Instrumental albums
Plas Johnson albums